The 2008–09 National Indoor Soccer League is the inaugural season for the league and the 31st anniversary of professional Division 1 indoor soccer in the United States. The members of the NISL's first season are the Baltimore Blast, the Massachusetts Twisters, the Monterrey La Raza, the Philadelphia KiXX, and the Rockford Rampage. The Orlando Sharks were supposed to play, but due to scheduling conflicts with the Amway Arena the Twisters took the Sharks' spot for the season.

The league kicked off on November 15, 2008 with the Philadelphia KiXX defeating the Massachusetts Twisters 34-11 and the Baltimore Blast defeating the Rockford Rampage 14-4. The regular season concluded March 29, 2009.

Each team played eighteen games, nine home and nine away. La Raza also played, and won, the Copa América against PASL-Pro and PASL-Premier teams.

Final standings

Blue indicates bye into the NISL Championship
Green indicates playoff berth clinched

Playoffs

Game 1
Friday, 10:35PM EST, April 3, 2009 at Monterrey Arena in Monterrey, Nuevo León

Game 2
Sunday, 5:35PM EST, April 5, 2009 at Rockford MetroCentre in Rockford, Illinois

Game 3
(Sudden death golden goal game)
Sunday, April 5, 2009 at Rockford MetroCentre in Rockford, Illinois (Immediately followed game two)

Championship
Saturday, 7:35PM EST, April 11, 2009 at 1st Mariner Arena in Baltimore, Maryland

Scoring leaders

GP = Games Played, G = Goals, A = Assists, Pts = Points

Player of the Week

Players of the Month

End of Year Awards

All-Rookie Team

All-NISL 1st Team

All-NISL 2nd Team

References

External links
 MISL

National Indoor Soccer League
Major Indoor Soccer League (2008–2014) seasons
NAt
Nat